Giorgios Katsibardis (26 January 1939 – 26 July 2018) was a Greek lawyer, athlete, writer and politician, founding member of PASOK. He has been a deputy for Boeotia and a deputy minister, as well as the president of SEGAS.

He was born in 1939 in Domvraina, in Beotia. He studied law at the University of Athens and practiced law. Many times he has defended non-profit organizations and co-operatives. At the same time, he was a champion on speed roads, a member of the National Athletics and Balkan Team (1960).

His political activity began at the Regime of the Colonels, as a member of the anti-dictatorial Panhellenic Liberation Movement, while in 1974 he was a founding member of PASOK. He served as a member of the Parliament for Boeotia for 23 years (1977-2000), while during the same period he served as President of SEGAS (1984-1987) and Deputy Minister of the Interior (1987-1988).

He died on 26 July 2018 from drowning at the age of 79.

References

1939 births
2018 deaths
20th-century Greek lawyers
Government ministers of Greece
PASOK politicians
Greek sportsperson-politicians
Greek MPs 1977–1981
Greek MPs 1981–1985
Greek MPs 1985–1989
Greek MPs 1989 (June–November)
Greek MPs 1990–1993
Greek MPs 1993–1996
Greek MPs 1996–2000
Greek MPs 1989–1990
National and Kapodistrian University of Athens alumni
Deaths by drowning
People from Boeotia